The Don Tooley House is a house located in Jerome, Idaho that was listed on the National Register of Historic Places in 1983.  It is a work of master stonemason H.T. Pugh and of John Hadam.

See also
 List of National Historic Landmarks in Idaho
 National Register of Historic Places listings in Jerome County, Idaho

References

Houses in Jerome County, Idaho
Houses on the National Register of Historic Places in Idaho
Houses completed in 1922
National Register of Historic Places in Jerome County, Idaho